Gigantochloa atter, the black bamboo,  sweet bamboo, or giant atter, is a bamboo species belonging to the genus Gigantochloa. It grows up to 20 m tall. It is native to Island Southeast Asia, but has become naturalized all over the South Asia.

Appearance
Culm is green with purple patches when young, which becomes purplish black when mature turns greyish purple when drying. Surface is smooth and glossy. Young shoots are purplish pink in color with green blades on culm sheaths. Culm is straight. Branching occurs only at top. Internode length is 45–60 cm, and diameter is 5–10 cm. Culm walls are thick.

Culm sheath is purplish pink with green blades in young plants turns dark brown when mature. It is triangular with a conical blade. Length of the sheath proper is 24–27 cm in length and 40–45 cm wide. Blade length is 4–7 cm. Auricles absent. Upper surface of the sheath covered with black hairs. Lower surface of the sheath is not hairy. Sheaths fall off early.

References

Bamboo for You
Kew.org

Bambusoideae